Geraldine Viswanathan (born 20 June 1995) is an Australian actress. She gained attention in the role of Kayla in the 2018 film Blockers, for which Refinery29 referred to her as "the film's breakout star". Viswanathan starred in the 2019 coming-of-age film Hala, as well as Bad Education. She also played a recurring role in the Australian series Janet King, and appears in the TBS comedy anthology Miracle Workers.

Early life
Viswanathan's father, Suresh Viswanathan, is a doctor who works in nuclear medicine and is of Indian Tamil descent. Her mother, Anja Raith, is from Switzerland and was raised by a father who was a filmmaker and ballet dancer. Raith was once an aspiring actress who attended musical theatre school in London before getting married and settling down in Newcastle; she runs an acting school called Anja's Place.

Viswanathan grew up with a younger sister and a deep love of horses and animals. She attended the Hunter School of the Performing Arts, Newcastle, where she was in drama class.

At the age of 15, Viswanathan and her family moved to Los Angeles, California for a few months, where she went through the process of securing a manager with the hopes of obtaining Disney and Nickelodeon roles. In later years, Viswanathan performed standup and sketch comedy with her group named "Freudian Nip".

In 2015, Viswanathan was shortlisted for the Heath Ledger Scholarship. She contemplated going to university to study international studies and media, but instead dove into acting and made working in the United States her goal, as roles in Australia are limited.

Career
At the age of four, Viswanathan appeared in a Kodak television commercial. In 2016, she appeared in Emo the Musical and went to Los Angeles for her first pilot season. In 2017, Viswanathan joined the cast of ABC's drama series Janet King in the role of Bonnie.

Viswanathan was once a reader in casting rooms, and was the reader for the Australian casting process for Crazy Rich Asians.

Her big break came in 2018, when she was cast in the movie Blockers. In the same year, she was cast in the Netflix film The Package and the drama film Hala which went to Sundance Film Festival. The Hollywood Reporter included her in its "Next Gen Talent" list as one of "20 rising stars among the blockbuster breakouts and small-screen discoveries who are shaking up the industry".

In 2019, Viswanathan was cast in the anthology series Miracle Workers. In 2019, Viswanathan played Rachel in the film Bad Education, which is based on a true story of an embezzlement scandal. She received critical acclaim at Sundance Film Festival, and a Emmy nomination.

Viswanathan starred in The Broken Hearts Gallery (2020). The film was due to be released in Summer of 2020, but was postponed to September due to the COVID-19 pandemic. In the film, she stars as the heroine Lucy, a gallery assistant who struggles to give up items from past relationships. About the film, she noted that she feels fortunate to represent brown girls on screen, and appreciated that her mother in the film is blonde and looks a lot like her real mother.

Viswanathan provided the voice of Tawnie in season six of BoJack Horseman.

In October 2021, she was cast in the psychological thriller film Cat Person, based on the a short story by Kristen Roupenian published in 2017 in The New Yorker.

In January 2022, Viswanathan was cast the film The Beanie Bubble, co-directed by Kristin Gore and Damian Kulash.

Personal life
In March 2020, Viswanathan purchased an apartment in Brooklyn, New York.

Filmography

Film

Television

References

External links

Living people
1995 births
21st-century Australian actresses
Australian actresses of Indian descent
Australian expatriate actresses in the United States
Australian film actresses
Australian people of Swiss-German descent
Australian people of Tamil descent
Australian television actresses
People from Newcastle, New South Wales
Tamil actresses